Singer is an unincorporated community and census-designated place in Beauregard Parish, Louisiana, United States. Its population was 287 as of the 2010 census. Its ZIP code is 70660.

Demographics

Notable native
Gil Dozier, Louisiana Commissioner of Agriculture and Forestry from 1976 to 1989. Interred at Newlin Cemetery in Singer.

Notes

Census-designated places in Beauregard Parish, Louisiana
Unincorporated communities in Louisiana
Census-designated places in Louisiana
Unincorporated communities in Beauregard Parish, Louisiana